Mere Mohsin is a 2019 Pakistani television series produced by Abdullah Kadwani and Asad Qureshi under 7th Sky Entertainment. It features Rabab Hashim and Syed Jibran in leads while Nazish Jehangir as antagonist.

Cast 

 Rabab Hashim as Soha
 Syed Jibran as Mohsin
 Mariyam Nafees as Nazia
 Nazish Jahangir as Sidra
 Jinaan Hussain as Batool
 Saba Hameed as Khursheed Begum
 Erum Akhtar as Jahan Ara
 Gul-e-Rana as Safia
 Tanveer Jamal as Raza
 Fazila Qazi as Aalia
 Faiza Gillani as Zahid's second wife
 Kamran Jilani as Zahid
 Daniyal Afzal as Zain
 Shajeer-ud-Din as Phuppa
 Saleem Mairaj as Khalid

References

External links 

 Official website

2019 Pakistani television series debuts